General elections were held in Cuba on 1 November 1920. Alfredo Zayas y Alfonso won the presidential election, whilst the National League (an alliance of the National Conservative Party and the Cuban Popular Party) emerged as the largest faction in the House of Representatives, winning 31 of the 59 seats.

Results

President

The figures do not include the results for Havana Province due to fraud and subsequent re-runs.

Senate

House of Representatives

References

Cuba
General
Presidential elections in Cuba
Parliamentary elections in Cuba
Cuba
Election and referendum articles with incomplete results